Ivan Babich (born 2 September 1982, Nazarovo, Krasnoyarsk Krai) is a Russian political figure and a deputy of the 8th State Duma.
 
In 2009, Babich graduated from the Siberian Federal University. After that, he engaged in entrepreneurship and was a co-owner, general director of RZD Region Service LLC, Hozopttorg LLC, Dealer LLC. He was a co-founder of the Kredit Express bank in Rostov-on-Don. Since September 2021, he has served as deputy of the 8th State Duma.

References
 

 

1982 births
Living people
Communist Party of the Russian Federation members
21st-century Russian politicians
Eighth convocation members of the State Duma (Russian Federation)
People from Nazarovo